Hulia Rural LLG a local-level government (LLG) of Koroba-Kopiago District in Hela Province, Papua New Guinea.

Wards
01. Alua/Kambi
02. Kela
03. Uruma
04. Piangwanda
05. Puju
06. Tigibi 1
07. Wabia 2
08. Wabia 1
09. Iangome
10. Damita 1
11. Hol'la
12. Dimu
13. Homa Pawa
14. Honaga
15. Lau'u
16. Pagale
17. Yabagaru
18. Davi Davi
19. Kuyali
20. Yarale
21. Hogombe
22. Tigibi 3
23. Dauli 1
24. Damita 2
25. Dauli 2
26. Dauli 3
27. Peri
28. Wabia 2
29. Wabia 3
30. Hubi Yabe
31. Takipupi

References 

Local-level governments of Hela Province